Luigi Roberto Cona (born 10 November 1965) is an Italian prelate of the Catholic Church who works in the diplomatic service of the Holy See.

Biography
Luigi Roberto Cona was born on 10 November 1965 in Niscemi, Sicily, Italy. He was ordained a priest for the Roman Catholic Diocese of Piazza Armerina on 20 April 1990. He has a degree in dogmatic theology.

He entered the Holy See Diplomatic Service on 1 July 2003, and has served in the apostolic nunciatures in Panama, Portugal, Cameroon, Morocco, Jordan, Turkey, in the Section for General Affairs of the Secretariat of State, and in the Pontifical Representation in Italy.
He was appointed assessor for General Affairs of the Secretariat of State on 24 October 2019.

On 26 October 2022, Pope Francis appointed him Titular Archbishop of Sala Consilina and Apostolic Nuncio to El Salvador.  He was consecrated as Archbishop on 2 December 2022.

See also
 List of heads of the diplomatic missions of the Holy See

References

Living people
1965 births
Apostolic Nuncios to El Salvador
Italian Roman Catholic titular archbishops
Diplomats of the Holy See
Pontifical Ecclesiastical Academy alumni